Gwynedd Mercy Academy High School is a private, Roman Catholic, all-girls high school in Gwynedd Valley, Pennsylvania.  It is located in the Roman Catholic Archdiocese of Philadelphia.

Background
Gwynedd Mercy Academy High School was established as the Academy of the Sisters of Mercy in 1861 by the Sisters of Mercy.  The school shares a campus with Gwynedd-Mercy College.  In 1861, the Sisters of Mercy established the Academy of the Sisters of Mercy in Philadelphia.

The Academy began in Assumption Parish and later changed location to a residence at Broad Street and Columbia Avenue in Philadelphia. By August 1863, there were 28 students. Over the years the Academy experienced many changes and eventually moved to the Taylor Estate in Gwynedd Valley, where the Sisters converted stables and erected a science building to serve the Academy and College from 1947 to 1955. In April 1955, construction of the building for the elementary and secondary schools was completed and the Academy of Mercy became Gwynedd Mercy Academy.

Enrollment continued to increase and in 1982, the Sisters of Mercy purchased the Spring House Public School to house the elementary division. The high school remained in the facility that was built in 1955.

Over the years, Gwynedd Mercy Academy has evolved its programs in response to changing needs. In Montgomery County there was a great need for specialized classrooms for Art and Music and for a Performing Arts Center. The first phase of construction was completed in August 1999. A new library, Art and Music rooms, music practice rooms, a writing lab and a tiered lecture hall, as well as new tennis courts and a track were included in this first phase.

Enrollment increases and student talents highlighted the need for continued development of a Performing Arts Center. The Renaissance Campaign was organized to finance the second phase which was completed in March 2004. This area encompasses the main entrance and lobby, a chapel with movable seats to accommodate 50 persons, and an auditorium which seats 525. Also included in that phase are storage areas, a dressing room and a TV studio.

According to its mission statement, "Rooted in the Catholic faith and charism of Mercy, Gwynedd Mercy Academy High School educates, inspires, and empowers young women to be merciful in spirit, innovative in thought, and courageous in leadership."

Notable alumnae
 Kate M. Harper 1974 - Pennsylvania State Representative

Gallery

See also
Gwynedd Mercy Academy Elementary

Notes and references

External links

 School Website

Catholic secondary schools in Pennsylvania
Educational institutions established in 1861
Girls' schools in Pennsylvania
Schools in Montgomery County, Pennsylvania
1861 establishments in Pennsylvania
Sisters of Mercy schools